Pterophorus candidalis is a moth of the family Pterophoridae. It is known from Taiwan, India, Sri Lanka, the New Hebrides, New Caledonia, Samoa, Tonga and most of Africa.

The wingspan is 15–28 mm. The head, antennae, thorax, mesothorax, tegulae, abdomen and legs are white. The forewings are white with a faint yellowish grey gloss. There are sparse dark scales at the base of the cleft and near the apex of the first lobe. The fringes are white. The hindwings are also white.

References

candidalis
Moths described in 1864
Moths of Africa